Prince of Persia is a video game franchise created by Jordan Mechner. It is built around a series of action-adventure games focused on various incarnations of the eponymous Prince, set in ancient and medieval Persia. 

The first two games in the series, Prince of Persia (1989) and Prince of Persia 2: The Shadow and the Flame (1993), were published by Broderbund. Prince of Persia 3D (1999), named for being the first installment to use 3D computer graphics, was developed by Red Orb Entertainment and published by The Learning Company on PC; The Dreamcast version was developed by Avalanche Software and published by Mattel Interactive. Ubisoft bought the rights to the franchise in 2001 and rebooted it with Prince of Persia: The Sands of Time (2003). Ubisoft has since developed and published four additional entries in the series: Prince of Persia: Warrior Within (2004), Prince of Persia: The Two Thrones (2006), Prince of Persia (2008), and Prince of Persia: The Forgotten Sands (2010), as well as a number of spin-offs and games for mobile devices.

Outside of the games, the franchise also includes a film adaptation based on The Sands of Time, written in part by Mechner, and released by Walt Disney Pictures in 2010; a graphic novel; and the Lego Prince of Persia toyline. Ubisoft's Assassin's Creed franchise is considered to be the spiritual successor to the series.

Games

Original trilogy
The first game in the series was created by Jordan Mechner after the success of Karateka. Drawing from multiple general sources of inspiration, including the One Thousand and One Nights stories, and films like Raiders of the Lost Ark and The Adventures of Robin Hood, the protagonist's character animation was created using a technique called rotoscoping, with Mechner using his brother as the model for the titular prince. The original Prince of Persia, with its more than 20 platform ports, is one of the most ported games in video game history.

Mechner enrolled in New York University's film department, producing an award-winning short film during his time there, before returning to design and direct a sequel to the original game. The sequel, Prince of Persia 2: The Shadow and the Flame, was developed internally at Broderbund with Mechner's supervision. The game, like its predecessor, received critical acclaim and high sales. Broderbund was subsequently purchased by The Learning Company, which was later acquired by US game company Mattel Interactive. In 1999, Prince of Persia 3D was developed and released under Broderbund's Red Orb label. Released for PC and the Dreamcast only, it was criticized by many users as being buggy, and was a commercial disappointment. The Broderbund/Learning Company's games division, the assets of which included the Prince of Persia franchise, was subsequently sold to Ubisoft.

The Sands of Time series
Mechner, who owned the Prince of Persia intellectual property, was brought in to work with Ubisoft on a reboot of the franchise, titled The Sands of Time, although he was originally wary after the failure of Prince of Persia 3D. The team they worked with was also working on Tom Clancy's Splinter Cell: their aim with the game was to "breathe new life into the action-adventure genre".

Mechner did not take part in the production of the next game, Prince of Persia: Warrior Within, and he commented on finding the dark atmosphere and heightened level of violence unappealing. The changes also provoked mixed reactions from critics, but sales were strong and a third game, eventually titled Prince of Persia: The Two Thrones, went into production. For The Two Thrones, the developers and artists tried to strike a balance between the light, cartoon-like tones of The Sands of Time, and the grittier mediums of Warrior Within.

In November 2008, Ubisoft revealed that it was working on a new entry in the franchise, which was later revealed to be Prince of Persia: The Forgotten Sands. The Windows, Xbox 360 and PlayStation 3 versions of the game filled in some of the narrative gap between The Sands of Time and Warrior Within; whereas the PSP, Wii, and the DS versions each feature their own alternative storylines. The game was released in May 2010, timed to tie in with The Sands of Time film adaptation.

Trilogy collection
The Prince of Persia Trilogy (known as Prince of Persia Trilogy 3D on the remastered collection's title screen) is a collection of The Sands of Time trilogy released on the PlayStation 2 and subsequently on the PlayStation 3 as part of the Classics HD range. The collection includes The Sands of Time, Warrior Within and The Two Thrones, all previously released on the PlayStation 2, Xbox and Microsoft Windows. The games were remastered in high-definition for the PlayStation 3 with 3D and PlayStation Network Trophy support on one Blu-ray Disc. The PlayStation 2 collection was released on October 27, 2006, in Europe, while the remastered collection was released on November 19, 2010, on Blu-ray in PAL regions. The release marks the first Classics HD title to not be published by Sony Computer Entertainment.

In North America, the three games were originally released separately as downloadable-only titles on the PlayStation Store. The first, The Sands of Time, was released on November 16, 2010, while the other two games followed in December. The Blu-ray version was to be released in North America on March 22, 2011 but the collection ended up being delayed until April 19.

Spin-offs and remakes
The first spin-off of the series was developed alongside and released in the same year as The Two Thrones for the Nintendo DS. Battles of Prince of Persia is a real-time strategy game set between The Sands of Time and Warrior Within. It received mediocre reviews from critics.

In 2006, concept designs surfaced hinting at another entry in the franchise. The game, titled simply Prince of Persia, was unveiled in 2008, with Ubisoft marketing it as a second reboot of the franchise, with its level and combat design harking back to the original 1989 game. The game was released in December 2008, receiving positive reviews from most video game outlets and decent sales. Alongside the main game, Ubisoft's Casablanca branch developed a direct sequel and spin-off for the Nintendo DS, titled Prince of Persia: The Fallen King, which received fair reviews.

In 2007, Gameloft and Ubisoft released Prince of Persia Classic, an enhanced remake of the original Prince of Persia for Java ME, Android, iOS, Xbox 360 (XBLA), and PlayStation 3 (PSN). The visual style was upgraded to resemble Prince of Persia: The Sands of Time, and the Prince himself was given some additional moves, such as the ability to roll, backflip, wall jump and stop time briefly during combat. However, the core gameplay remains the same as the original – the player must defeat Jaffar within one hour while watching out for the many traps and defeating the guards they encounter.

There have been a number of mobile games for Java ME-based phones developed by Gameloft, some based on older PC or console titles with 2D graphics and others loosely based on contemporary games but with 2D graphics and different gameplay due to technology constraints. Gameloft has also developed some ports for both the iPhone and the iPad. The first spin-off by Gameloft was titled Prince of Persia: Harem Adventures, released for Java phones in 2003. Specifically, the company has developed HD remakes of the original Prince of Persia in 2007, and its sequel The Shadow and the Flame in July 2013.

In 2018, Ubisoft under the banner of its entity Ketchapp released Prince of Persia: Escape, a mobile game for Android and iOS. It is a "runner" game made up of different levels, and the player can customize the protagonist with outfits from past games. Reviewing for Pocket Gamer, Cameron Bald called Prince of Persia: Escape a "mundane game crushed under the weight of excessive greed". In August 2022, a follow-up, Prince of Persia: Escape 2, was released.

Future plans
In 2012, leaked images from a project entitled Osiris were assumed to be the next Prince of Persia title. Jordan Mechner even commented on his Twitter account that the images were not from a Prince of Persia game. A year later, Yannis Mallat, CEO of Ubisoft Montreal, said that the franchise was being "paused", saying that "as soon as we have something to show, we will". In the following months, Ubisoft confirmed that it was either planning or considering next-generation entries in multiple franchises, including Prince of Persia. A video uploaded by a Ubisoft Montreal artist in 2012 but only discovered in 2020 showed a gameplay trailer for Prince of Persia Redemption which would have been released for Windows, Xbox 360, and PlayStation 3. According to Jonathan Cooper, a former Ubisoft animator at the time, the trailer was a mockup of the planned gameplay for the title created by Khai Nguyen, used to pitch the game concept. The game never developed beyond that point, though the work on the pitch trailer was used to prepare a similar trailer for Assassin's Creed III for Ubisoft.

A remake of the Sands of Time, formally announced at Ubisoft Forward 2020, was originally scheduled for release on January 21, 2021, for Microsoft Windows, PlayStation 4 and Xbox One, but Ubisoft delayed the remake indefinitely. In its quarterly financial report, Ubisoft stated the remake is expected to be out sometime during its 2022–23 fiscal year. The remake's development was moved to Ubisoft Montréal, a change from Ubisoft Mumbai and Ubisoft Pune. The company said the 2023 fiscal year release target was no longer being targeted.

Adaptations

Graphic novel
Jordan Mechner finished writing the story for a graphic novel in 2007. The novel was written by A.B. Sina, and illustrated by Alex Puvilland and LeUyen Pham. It was released by First Second Books in autumn 2008. The story follows two Princes, jumping between the 9th and 13th centuries. Although it belongs to the franchise the plot is not related to any of the game continuities or that of the 2010 film.

Film adaptation

In 2010, a film adaptation of The Sands of Time was released by Walt Disney Pictures. Starring Jake Gyllenhaal as Prince Dastan, it would go on to receive mixed reception, but still gross $336 million in theaters. Besides The Sands of Time, the film also incorporated elements from Warrior Within and The Two Thrones, the two other titles from the Sands of Time trilogy of the Prince of Persia video game franchise.

Upon the film's release, it was accompanied by Before the Sandstorm, a 2010 one-shot comic book published by Disney Publishing Worldwide. This comic serves as both a direct prequel and sequel to the feature film, and explains the motives and backgrounds of some characters. It was written by Jordan Mechner and featured illustrations by Todd McFarlane, Niko Henrichon, David Lopez and Bernard Chang.

Lego Prince of Persia was released by The Lego Group in 2010, as part of the company's strategy to produce sets based on Disney properties. Based on the feature film, Lego released six sets within the theme, as well as a short animated movie, before discontinuing it.

Reception

Awards
The success of the Prince of Persia series resulted in Guinness World Records awarding the series 6 world records in the Guinness World Records: Gamer's Edition 2008. These records include First Motion-Capture Animation in a Video Game and Highest Rated Platformer on PS2 and Xbox.

Impact and legacy
South Korean singer-songwriter Kim Kwang-Jin released the song "Magic Castle", with lyrics inspired from the storyline of the original Prince of Persia.

In 1992, Russian author Victor Pelevin wrote a book called A Werewolf Problem in Central Russia and Other Stories, in which there is a short story called "Prince of Gosplan". The story is greatly influenced by the game; the main hero of the story lives in a mixed reality of the real world and video games and identifies himself as Prince of Persia. He tries to understand if his life is real or if he is just seeing it on a computer display.

The feel of the gameplay in Tomb Raider was intended to evoke that of the original Prince of Persia.

The Assassin's Creed series originated out of ideas for a sequel for Prince of Persia: The Sands of Time. Its critical and financial success led Ubisoft to request Ubisoft Montreal to develop a sequel, aiming for the Xbox 360 and PlayStation 3. The Ubisoft Montreal team decided on taking the gameplay from The Sands of Time into an open world approach, taking advantage of the improved processing power to render larger spaces and crowds. Narratively, the team wanted to move away from the Prince being someone next in line for the throne but to have to work for it; combined with research into secret societies led them to focus on the Assassins, heavily borrowing from the novel Alamut. They developed a narrative where the player would control an Assassin that served as a bodyguard for a non-playable Prince, leading them to call this game Prince of Persia: Assassin. The "Animus" device allowed them to explain certain facets of gameplay, such as accounting when the player fails a mission, in the same way they had done in The Sands of Time.

References

External links

 Official website

 
Ubisoft franchises
Video games set in Iran
Video games set in the Middle East
Video games developed in the United States
Video game franchises
Parkour video games
Video game franchises introduced in 1989
First Second Books books
Video games adapted into films
Video games adapted into comics